The Fortúatha were "kingdoms not ruled directly by members of the dominant dynasty of a province".  They have also been described as "in effect, people belonging to a different stock from that of the rulers of the territory", yet sometimes enjoying a position of favour with the ruling people.

Fortúatha groups
Population-groups classed as fortúatha included the Calraige, Ciarraige, Corca Fhir Trí, Delbhna, Déisi, Gailenga, Grecraige, Luighne, Masraige and Setantii.

The status of each population-group could differ from one part of the island to another, with some fortúatha being class as aithechtúatha in other regions.  In Leinster, some reckoned among the fortúatha had previously held the provincial kingship.  These were the Dál Messin Corb and its principal septs, the Uí Garrchon and the Uí Enechglaiss.

People
Among the early medieval Irish were many notable people whose population-group were classed as fortúatha. They included:

 Brigid of Kildare ( 451–525) - of the Fortuatha Laigin
 Brendan -  of the Altraige of Ciarraige Luachra
 Iarlaithe mac Loga of Tuam (fl. 6th century) - a member of the Conmaicne
 Suibne moccu Fir Thrí (died 11 January 657) - possibly of the Corca Fhir Trí
 Neide mac Onchu (fl.  800) - a member of the Conmaicne
 Martan of Clonmacnoise (died 868) - a member of the Dartraighe
 Brian Bóruma mac Cennétig, ( 941 – 23 April 1014) - Dál gCais
 Vilbaldr DufÞakrsson (fl.  980) - of the Osraighe
 Cúán úa Lothcháin (died 1024) - of the Gailenga of Tethba
 Flann Mainistrech (died 25 November 1056) - of the Ciannachta of Brega
 Ruaidrí Ó Gadhra (died 1256) - of the Gailenga of Connacht

Annalistic references
All quotes from the Annals of the Four Masters, unless otherwise stated.

 423: Máel Calland mac Fergal, king of the Fortuatha. (Fragmentary Annals of Ireland)
 774: The battle of Cill Coice, in which Fearghal, son of Dunghal, son of Faelchu, lord of Fortuatha Laighean, was slain by the king Donnchadh.
 776: The battle of Righ (the Ryewater river) was gained by the men of Breagh over the Leinstermen, on the day of Allhallows (Nov. 1) precisely, wherein were slain Cucongalt (king of Ui Garchon at Arklow), lord of Rath Inbhir, and Fearghal, son of Ailell, lord of Cinel Ucha.
 783: Domnall son of Ceithernach, king of Uí Garrchon. (Annals of Ulster)
 825: The destruction of Dun Laighen, at Druim, by the Pagans (Vikings), where Conaing, son of Cuchongelt, lord of the Fortuatha, was slain, with many others.
 827: An encampment of the Laigin was overwhelmed by the heathens, and Conall son of Cú Chongalt, king of the Fortuatha, and countless others fell there. (Annals of Ulster)
 972: Finnsnechta, son of Cinaedh, lord of Fortuatha-Laighean, died.
 983: Fiachra, son of Finnshneacta, chief of Fortuatha-Laighean.
 1014: Domhnall, son of Ferghal, king of the Fortuatha. (Chronicon Scotorum)
 1039: Domhnall, son of Donnchadh, lord of Ui-Faelain, was slain by Domhnall Ua Fearghaile, lord of the Fortuatha.
 1043: Domnall ua Fergaile, king of the Fortuatha of Laigin, was killed by the son of Tuathal (his own people). (Chronicon Scotorum)
 1072: Gillaphadraig O'Fearghaile, lord of the Fortuatha, was killed.
 1095: Domnall Dubh Ua Fearghaile, lord of Fortuatha-Laighean, died.
 1170: Murchadh Ua Fearghail, lord of the Fortuatha, was slain by Ua Fiachrach, lord of Ui-Fineachlais.

References

 Early Christian Ireland, p. 14, 99, 102, 104, 116, 236, 534, 576, 674, 676, 678, 684, 685, 690, 693, 695, 705, by Thomas Charles-Edwards, Cambridge, 2000.
 Irish Kings and High Kings, p. 45, Francis John Byrne, 3rd edition, Dublin, 2001.
 Early Irish Saints’ Cults and their Constituencies, pp. 72–102, Ériu' 54, T.M. Charles-Edwards, 2004.
 Ireland, 400-800, Dáibhí Ó Cróinín, pp. 98,in A New History of Ireland, volume one, 2005. 
 Medieval Ireland: Territorial, Political and Economic Divisions'', Paul MacCotter, Four Courts Press, 2008.

External links
 http://www.rootsweb.ancestry.com/~irlkik/ihm/province.htm

Historical Celtic peoples
Gaelic-Irish nations and dynasties
History of County Armagh
History of County Donegal
History of County Kildare
History of County Meath
History of County Wexford
History of County Wicklow
Tribes of ancient Ireland